was a subgroup of the Japanese girl groups Berryz Kobo and Cute, formed in 2007 by Up-Front Promotion and associated with Hello! Project. The members consisted of Momoko Tsugunaga and Miyabi Natsuyaki from Berryz Kobo, and Airi Suzuki from Cute. Their vocals were backed by the band Dolce, which formerly went under name Busters! in 2008.

Buono! was initially formed as an idol project group to perform theme songs for the Shugo Chara! anime series, which ran from 2007 to 2010. After the show's end, they moved labels from Pony Canyon to Zetima and starred in the horror film Ring of Curse. Between 2012 and 2016 Buono! became less active and only performed as guest at various Hello! project events. Their radio show "Trattoria Buono!" was still on air until February 2015. They returned in 2016 before finally disbanding in 2017.

History

2007–2010: Formation 
Buono! was officially announced as a new girl group at the Nakayoshi Festival 2007 on July 21, 2007. The group was formed to sing both the opening ("Kokoro no Tamago") and ending ("Honto no Jibun") themes for the anime adaptation of the Shugo Chara! manga. The members consisted of Momoko Tsugunaga and Miyabi Natsuyaki from Berryz Kobo; and Airi Suzuki from Cute, who have worked together as labelmates in Hello! Project since joining the label in 2002 as Hello! Project Kids. Throughout their career, Buono! continued to record theme songs for Shugo Chara! and their works were featured in the anime's soundtrack.

Buono! also partnered up with pizza chain, Pizza-La, and starred in their commercials. They also had a weekly radio show endorsed by Pizza-La called Pizza-La presents Cafe Buono!

Buono! was to perform at the Japan Expo in Stockholm, Sweden, on May 24, 2009, but the convention was cancelled a month earlier on April 21, 2009, due to "the financial change in world economy, severe competition from other festivals/concerts as well as poor ticket sales."

2010–2012: Label change 
In December 2010, Buono! moved labels from Pony Canyon to Zetima. Their 11th single, "Zassou No Uta", was released on February 2, 2011. On October 29, 2011, Buono! starred in the horror film, Ring of Curse, marking their first feature film together as a group.

In February 2012, Buono! performed in Paris, France with a sold-out concert of 800 people. On June 25, 2012, Buono! took part in Yubi Matsuri, an idol festival produced by Rino Sashihara from AKB48 attended by 8,000 people.

2016–2017: Final years and disbandment 

After spending four years without CD releases, Buono! returned in 2016 with the song "So La Ti Do (Hey, Hey)" and a sold-out live event titled Buono! Festa 2016 held on August 25, 2016. Around the second half of 2016, both Tsugunaga and Suzuki announced that they were leaving Hello! Project in June 2017. On May 22, 2017, Buono! had their final concert, Buono! Live 2017: Pienezza, at the Yokohama Arena. Performing guests included Cute, Country Girls, and Natsuyaki's new girl group Pink Cres. 15,000 people attended the concert. The event was also broadcast on Nico Nico Live.

Members

Buono! 

 from Berryz Kobo – leader
 from Berryz Kobo – sub-leader
 from Cute – health guardian

Dolce 

 Eji – keyboard
  – guitar
  – guitar
  ( – bass
  – drums

Discography

Studio albums

Extended plays

Compilation albums

Singles

Filmography

Film

References

External links 
 Buono!'s official YouTube channel

 
Japanese girl groups
Japanese idol groups
Hello! Project groups
Japanese pop music groups
Japanese rock music groups
Japanese pop rock music groups
Musical groups established in 2007
2007 establishments in Japan
Musical groups from Tokyo
Child musical groups
Japanese musical trios